Moths of Lesotho represent about 90 known moth species. The moths (mostly nocturnal) and butterflies (mostly diurnal) together make up the taxonomic order Lepidoptera.

This is a list of moth species which have been recorded in Lesotho.

Arctiidae
Cyana pretoriae (Distant, 1897)
Cymaroa grisea (Thunberg, 1784)
Macrosia chalybeata Hampson, 1901
Micrilema craushayi Hampson, 1903

Crambidae
Ancylolomia prepiella Hampson, 1919
Caffrocrambus chalcimerus (Hampson, 1919)
Lamprophaia ablactalis (Walker, 1859)
Nomophila noctuella ([Denis & Schiffermüller], 1775)

Geometridae
Drepanogynis arcuifera Prout, 1934
Drepanogynis aspitatoides Krüger, 2002
Drepanogynis bifasciata (Dewitz, 1881)
Drepanogynis determinata (Walker, 1860)
Drepanogynis hilaris Krüger, 2002
Drepanogynis hypoplea Prout, 1938
Drepanogynis mixtaria Guenée, 1858
Drepanogynis nipholibes (Prout, 1938)
Drepanogynis pulla Krüger, 2002
Epirrhoe achatina Prout, 1915
Isturgia disputaria (Guenée, 1858)

Hepialidae
Eudalaca albistriata (Hampson, 1910)

Lasiocampidae
Bombycomorpha bifascia (Walker, 1855)

Lymantriidae
Bracharoa quadripunctata (Wallengren, 1875)

Metarbelidae
Arbelodes albitorquata (Hampson, 1910)
Arbelodes deprinsi Lehmann, 2010
Arbelodes sticticosta (Hampson, 1910)
Metarbela leucostigma (Hampson, 1910)
Teragra leucostigma Hampson, 1910

Noctuidae
Achaea sordida (Walker, 1865)
Acontia citripennis (Hampson, 1910)
Acontia dispar (Walker, [1858])
Acontia natalis (Guenée, 1852)
Acontia sphendonistis (Hampson, 1902)
Acontia tanzaniae Hacker, Legrain & Fibiger, 2010
Acontia trychaenoides Wallengren, 1856
Acrapex aenigma (Felder & Rogenhofer, 1874)
Acrapex carnea Hampson, 1905
Adisura aerugo (Felder & Rogenhofer, 1874)
Agrotis biconica Kollar, 1844
Agrotis crassilinea Wallengren, 1860
Agrotis longidentifera (Hampson, 1903)
Agrotis segetum ([Denis & Schiffermüller], 1775)
Athetis chionopis Hampson, 1909
Athetis melanephra Hampson, 1909
Athetis pallicornis (Felder & Rogenhofer, 1874)
Caffristis ferrogrisea (Hampson, 1902)
Callopistria latreillei (Duponchel, 1827)
Calpiformis craushayi (Hampson, 1905)
Caradrina glaucistis Hampson, 1902
Caradrina xanthopis (Hampson, 1909)
Chrysodeixis acuta (Walker, [1858])
Cucullia pallidistria Felder & Rogenhofer, 1874
Cyligramma latona (Cramer, 1775)
Diaphone eumela (Stoll, 1781)
Diargyria argyrogramma Krüger, 2005
Diargyria argyrostolmus Krüger, 2005
Eublemma anachoresis (Wallengren, 1863)
Eublemma flaviceps Hampson, 1902
Eublemma foedosa (Guenée, 1852)
Eublemma scitula (Rambur, 1833)
Eublemma uninotata Hampson, 1902
Euplexia augens Felder & Rogenhofer, 1874
Grammodes euclidioides Guenée, 1852
Grammodes stolida (Fabricius, 1775)
Heliocheilus stigmatia (Hampson, 1903)
Heliothis scutuligera Guenée, 1852
Leucania loreyi (Duponchel, 1827)
Masalia disticta (Hampson, 1902)
Masalia galatheae (Wallengren, 1856)
Matopo typica Distant, 1898
Mentaxya muscosa Geyer, 1837
Mentaxya rimosa (Guenée, 1852)
Micragrotis puncticostata (Hampson, 1902)
Micragrotis strigibasis (Hampson, 1902)
Oligia ambigua (Walker, 1858)
Ophiusa selenaris (Guenée, 1852)
Ozarba hypoxantha (Wallengren, 1860)
Plusia angulum Guenée, 1852
Sesamia cretica Lederer, 1857
Sesamia epunctifera Hampson, 1902
Sesamia rubritincta Hampson, 1902
Spodoptera exigua (Hübner, 1808)
Syngrapha circumflexa (Linnaeus, 1767)
Thysanoplusia exquisita (Felder & Rogenhofer, 1874)
Trichoplusia ni (Hübner, [1803])
Trichoplusia orichalcea (Fabricius, 1775)
Tycomarptes inferior (Guenée, 1852)
Zalaca snelleni (Wallengren, 1875)

Nolidae
Earias insulana (Boisduval, 1833)

Psychidae
Criocharacta amphiactis Meyrick, 1939

Pterophoridae
Platyptilia bowkeri Kovtunovich & Ustjuzhanin, 2011
Platyptilia sochivkoi Kovtunovich & Ustjuzhanin, 2011
Hellinsia basuto Kovtunovich & Ustjuzhanin, 2011
Merrifieldia innae Kovtunovich & Ustjuzhanin, 2011

Pyralidae
Aglossa phaealis Hampson, 1906

References

External links 
 AfroMoths

Moths
Moths
Lesotho
Lesotho